Alexey Petrovich Bogolyubov (16 March 1824 – 3 February 1896) was a Russian landscape painter.

Biography

Bogolyubov was born in the Pomeranie village of Novgorod Gubernia. His father was retired colonel Pyotr Gavriilovich Bogolyubov. Bogolyubov's maternal grandfather was the philosopher and social critic Alexander Radishchev.

In 1841, Bogolyubov graduated from military school, serving in the Russian Navy and travelling with the fleet to many countries. In 1849, he started to attend classes of the Saint Petersburg Academy of Arts, where he studied under Maxim Vorobiev. The young painter was greatly influenced by Ivan Ayvazovsky. In 1853, he finished the Academy with a major Gold medal. He retired as a navy officer and was appointed an artist to the Navy headquarters.

From 1854 to 1860, he travelled around Europe and worked prolifically. In Rome, he was acquainted with Alexander Ivanov, who convinced Bogolyubov to focus more on drawing. In Düsseldorf, Bogolyubov took classes from the painter Andreas Achenbach. In Paris, he admired the artists of the Barbizon School. French painters Camille Corot and Charles-François Daubigny were good friends and collaborators with Bogolyubov. He also painted the frescoes in the Alexander Nevsky Cathedral.

Bogolyubov returned to Russia in 1860. He exhibited his works in the Academy and received the title of professor. For some time, he taught in the Academy. In the 1860s, he traveled along the Volga. His paintings lost all traces of Romanticism, replacing that element with staunch realism of the natural. In 1871 he was elected to the Imperial Academy of Arts.

From 1870, he became close to the Wanderers art movement, participated in all their exhibitions. He became a member of their board. Much older than most of the other members of the movement, he had reservations on their social ideas. In 1873, Bogolyubov left the Academy in solidarity with his fellow Itinerants. He even tried to create an alternative Russian Academy of Arts in Rome.

After 1873, Bogolyubov lived primarily in Paris, because of his heart condition. His house was like a Russian colony: frequent visitors included Ivan Turgenev, Ilya Yefimovich Repin, Vasily Polenov, Mark Antokolski, Vasili Vasilyevich Vereshchagin.

In 1885, Bogolyubov opened an art museum in Saratov, the Radischev Art Museum, named after his grandfather. It was opened to the general public seven years earlier than the Tretyakov Gallery in Moscow and fifteen years earlier than the Russian Museum in Saint Petersburg. The naming of the museum after the "first Russian revolutionary", Alexander Radishchev, was a direct challenge to the authorities: Bogolyubov had to endure a legal battle to get permission.

Bogolyubov died on 3 February 1896 in Paris. He left all his money and capital (around 200 thousand Russian rubles (approximately US$6 million)) to the museum and its painting school. The school was opened after Bogolyubov's death and named Bogolyubov's Painting School (Боголюбовское Рисовальное Училище). Among painters who attended Bogolyubov's School were such important modernist painters as Victor Borisov-Musatov, Alexei Karev and Pavel Kuznetsov.

Selected works

Footnotes

References
 Bogoliubov. by M. I. Andronnikova. Moscow. 1962

External links
 Alexey Bogolyubov Notes of an Sailor-Artist  

19th-century painters from the Russian Empire
Russian male painters
1824 births
1896 deaths
Russian marine artists
19th-century male artists from the Russian Empire
Imperial Academy of Arts alumni
Full Members of the Imperial Academy of Arts
Awarded with a large gold medal of the Academy of Arts
Peredvizhniki
Burials at Tikhvin Cemetery